Trapeza is a village and a community in the municipal unit of Diakopto, Achaea, Greece. It is located 4 km southeast of Diakopto and 8 km west of Akrata. In 2001 Trapeza had a population of 274 for the village and 314 for the community, which includes the village Paralia Trapezis. Between 1892 and 1940, its name was Nea Voura (Νέα Βούρα).

Trapeza is located on a cliff, about 130 m above the Gulf of Corinth. The Greek National Road 8A (Patras - Corinth) and the railway Patras - Corinth run along the shore below the village. Trapeza has a well known beach called Pounta. The ancient city of Boura may have been located near present Trapeza.

Climate

Trapeza has a hot-summer Mediterranean climate (Köppen climate classification: Csa). Trapeza experiences hot, dry summers and mild, wet winters.

Population

External links
 Trapeza on GTP Travel Pages
 Trapeza on www.ediakopto.gr

See also

List of settlements in Achaea

References

Aigialeia
Diakopto
Populated places in Achaea